The 2001 Honda Grand Prix of Monterey was a CART motor race held on October 14, 2001 at the Mazda Raceway Laguna Seca in California, United States. It was the 19th round of the 2001 CART season.

Background
In the lead-up to this event, Honda would announce that they would withdraw from CART at the conclusion of the 2002 season, in a direct response to both the Pop-Off Valve controversy in the first half of the year and the Naturally Aspirated 3.5L Engine announcement for 2003. Members of Honda Performance Development would outright admit that they felt the situation in CART was no longer good for engine manufacturers. Rumors would also abound that Ford might do the same.

Qualifying
Brazilian driver Gil de Ferran set the pole, fellow Brazilian and his teammate Hélio Castroneves, from Penske Racing, started alongside him at the first row.

Race summary
At the start, the American driver Michael Andretti, from Team Motorola had a contact with the Swedish driver Kenny Brack, from Team Rahal. Some metres later, Brack collided with the Brazilian driver Maurício Gugelmin, from PacWest Racing, and suffered a tire problem. Some laps later, five laps behind, Kenny would retire.

At lap two, the first caution came out as the Forsythe Racing Canadian drivers Alex Tagliani and Patrick Carpentier collided into each other. Patrick retired. The top five after three laps were: Gil de Ferran, Helio Castroneves, New Zealand driver Scott Dixon, from PacWest Racing, the Brazilian Tony Kanaan, from Mo Nunn Racing, and Canadian driver Paul Tracy from Team Green.

Then, at lap seven, the Chip Ganassi Racing pit was on fire. Two mechanics suffered slight burns, but they continued in the race. The restart came at lap eight. The 2nd caution happened at lap 11, as the American Forsythe Racing driver Bryan Herta spun his countryman Casey Mears from Mo Nunn Racing. The Brazilian driver Max Wilson from Arciero Racing was also involved. Wilson retired.

The restart came out at lap 15. The third caution happened at lap 18, as the Brazilian Roberto Moreno, from Patrick Racing, had hit the wall. Then, the Bettenhausen Racing driver Michel Jourdain Jr., from Mexico, also hit the wall. Both retired.

The restart came out at lap 24. Then, the former Formula One Japanese driver Shinji Nakano, from Fernández Racing retired due to mechanical problems, at lap 43. The fourth caution was out.

After 43 laps, this was the top six: Castroneves, Dixon, de Ferran, Tora Takagi, Christian Fittipaldi and Tracy. After 44 laps, de Ferran led most laps at that time: 36. The restart came out at lap 46. Two laps later, Tagliani overtook the Scottish driver Dario Franchitti, from Team Green at The Corkscrew. Tagliani pushed Franchitti too much in the gravel, but Franchitti was still in the race.

At lap 49, Chip Ganassi Racing driver Memo Gidley, from United States hit Michael Andretti, causing a fifth caution. The top six after some pit stops were Adrian Fernandez, Max Papis, Memo Gidley—these drivers did not make their pit stops—and de Ferran, Dixon and Jimmy Vasser.

During the pit exit, Castroneves hit Paul Tracy. The Canadian spun. The restart came out at lap 53. At this lap, Franchitti hit the Brazilian Newman-Haas Racing driver Cristiano da Matta at Turn two. sixth caution. Da Matta retired. Paul Tracy went to the pits just to do a burnout in Castroneves' pit.

The restart came out at lap 57. At lap 62, Fernandez pitted and lost his lead to Max Papis. Then, the seventh caution happened, as Dario Franchitti suffered brake problems and hit the wall. At the same moment, Paul Tracy had a suspension problem, due to the incident with Castroneves at the pits.

The restart came out at lap 65. At lap 66, Sigma Autosport Spaniard Oriol Servià went airborne, after hit Maurício Gugelmin from behind. Both drivers retired. Servia's car did a frontflip. Servià suffered slight neck pains, but he was ok. The restart came out at lap 68 with 5:50 minutes to go. Max Papis won the race. It was the third and final win in CART for the Italian. It was the sixth Team Rahal win in that season. Memo Gidley finished second, with Gil de Ferran third.

Race Results

Race Shortened due to two hour time limit* = Indicates 1 bonus point for pole and 1 bonus point for most laps leadAverage speed: 84.919 mphCautions: 8 for 29 lapsMargin of victory: .794 secLead changes: 4

References

Houston Grand Prix, 2001
Monterey Grand Prix, 2001
Monterey Grand Prix